Bahujan Vikas Aaghadi (English: Bahujan Development Front) is a regional  political party in the Vasai-Virar region of Maharashtra. It was originally known as Vasai Vikas Aaghadi. The party is lead and founded by Hitendra Thakur who was a one-time member of the Maharashtra Legislative Assembly on an Indian National Congress ticket and two time independent MLA before founding the party.

Baliram Sukur Jadhav of the BVA, backed by Hitendra Thakur, was elected to the 15th Lok Sabha in 2009 and declared unconditional support to the UPA government. Kshitij Thakur, MLA from Nalasopara, Rajeev Patil, the first mayor of Vasai-Virar City Municipal Corporation are some of the well known local leaders associated with the party.

Career 
In 2009, in the 15th Lok Sabha election, Bahujan Vikas Aaghadi won the Palghar seat and Baliram Jadhav became the first member of parliament from the party.

Aaghadi lost the 16th Lok Sabha election to BJP's Chintaman Vanga.

In 2009 Maharashtra Legislative Assembly election, Bahujan Vikas Aaghadi bagged two seats: Boisar where Vilas Tare and Nalasopara where Kshitij Thakur won the elections.

In the 2014 Maharashtra Legislative Assembly election, Bahujan Vikas Aaghadi increased its tally to 3 seats, holding Boisar and Nalasopara and adding Vasai where Hitendra Thakur won.

Vasai Virar Municipal Corporation
In 2015, The BVA swept the Vasai Virar Municipal Corporation polls by winning 106 seats. Vasai elected its first woman Mayor, Pravina Thakur for Bahujan Vikas Aaghadi. Pravina Thakur is married to Hitendra Thakur, MLA from Vasai.

Many of the winners faced no opposition candidate. The BVA is one of the strongest parties in Vasai-Virar region.

2019 Assembly election
In the 2019 Assembly Elections, Bahujan Vikas Aghadi won all three of the seats it contested. The newly elected MLA's are Rajesh Raghunath Patil, Kshitij Thakur, and Hitendra Thakur.

References

External links
 Official Website

 Political parties in Maharashtra
 Political schisms
 Ambedkarite political parties
2009 establishments in Maharashtra
Political parties established in 2009